Robert III (c. 13374 April 1406), born John Stewart, was King of Scots from 1390 to his death in 1406. He was also High Steward of Scotland from 1371 to 1390 and held the titles of Earl of Atholl (1367–1390) and Earl of Carrick (1368–1390) before ascending the throne at about the age of 53 years. He was the eldest son of King Robert II and Elizabeth Mure and was legitimized by the second marriage of his parents and by papal dispensation in 1349.

John joined his father and other magnates in a rebellion against his great-uncle David II early in 1363 but submitted to him soon afterward. He was married to Anabella Drummond by 1367. In 1368 David created him Earl of Carrick. His father became king in 1371 after the unexpected death of the childless King David. In the succeeding years, Carrick was influential in the government of the kingdom but became progressively more impatient at his father's longevity. In 1384 Carrick was appointed the king's lieutenant after having influenced the general council to remove Robert II from direct rule. Carrick's administration saw a renewal of the conflict with England. In 1388 the Scots defeated the English at the Battle of Otterburn where the Scots' commander, James, Earl of Douglas, was killed. By this time Carrick had been badly injured from a horse-kick but it was the loss of his powerful ally, Douglas, that saw a turnaround in magnate support in favour of his younger brother Robert, Earl of Fife, to whom the council transferred the lieutenancy in December 1388.

In 1390, Robert II died and Carrick ascended the throne as Robert III but without authority to rule directly. Fife continued as Lieutenant until February 1393 when power was returned to the king in conjunction with his son David. At a council in 1399 owing to the king's 'sickness of his person', David, now Duke of Rothesay, became Lieutenant under the supervision of a special parliamentary group dominated by Fife, now styled Duke of Albany. After this, Robert III withdrew to his lands in the west and for a time played little or no part in affairs of state. He was powerless to interfere when a dispute between Albany and Rothesay arose in 1401, leading to Rothesay's imprisonment and death in March 1402. The general council absolved Albany from blame and reappointed him as Lieutenant. The only impediment now remaining to an Albany Stewart monarchy was the king's only surviving son, James, Earl of Carrick. After a clash with Albany's Douglas allies in 1406, the 11-year-old James tried to escape to France. The vessel was intercepted and James became the prisoner of Henry IV of England. Robert III died shortly after learning of his heir's imprisonment.

Early life
John Stewart was born around the year 1337 to Robert, Steward of Scotland and heir presumptive to the throne, and his wife Elizabeth Mure. Robert's mother Marjorie and her half-brother, David II, were the children of the first Bruce king, Robert I.  
Robert Stewart and Elizabeth Mure were married in 1336 by traditional marriage, recognized as legally binding but not recognized by the Church. The marriage was criticized for being uncanonical, so they married a second time in 1349, after receiving a papal dispensation from Pope Clement VI dated 22 November 1347. Therefore, although their children were actually legitimate, having been born after the first marriage of their parents, John, his three brothers and six sisters were legitimised by their parents' second Church-sanctioned marriage. Styled Lord of Kyle, John is first recorded in the 1350s as the commander of a campaign in the Lordship of Annandale to re-establish Scottish control over English occupied territory. In 1363, he joined his father along with the earls of Douglas and March in a failed insurrection against Robert's uncle, David II. The reasons for the rebellion were varied. In 1362, David II supported several of his royal favorites in their titles to lands in the Stewart earldom of Monteith and thwarted Stewart claims to the earldom of Fife. The King's involvement and eventual marriage with Margaret Drummond may also have represented a threat in the Steward's own earldom of Strathearn where the Drummonds also had interests, while Douglas and March mistrusted David's intentions towards them. These nobles were also unhappy at the king's squandering of funds provided to him for his ransom, and with the prospect that they could be sent to England as guarantors for the ransom payments. The dissension between the King and the Stewarts looked to have been settled before the end of spring 1367.
 
On 31 May the Steward resigned the earldom of Atholl to John, who by this time was already married to Annabella Drummond, the daughter of the queen's deceased brother, Sir John Drummond. David II reinforced the position of John and Annabella by providing them with the Earldom of Carrick on 22 June 1368 and the tacit approval of John as the king's probable heir. A Stewart succession was suddenly endangered when David II had his marriage to Margaret annulled in March 1369 leaving the king free to remarry and with the prospect of a Bruce heir.

On 22 February 1371 David II (who was preparing to marry the Earl of March's sister, Agnes Dunbar) unexpectedly died, presumably to the relief of both John and his father. Robert was crowned at Scone Abbey on 27 March 1371 and before this date had given John—now styled Steward of Scotland—the ancestral lands surrounding the Firth of Clyde. The manner in which the succession was to take place was first entailed by Robert I when female heirs were excluded and David II attempted unsuccessfully on several occasions to have the council change the succession procedure. Robert II quickly moved to ensure the succession of John when the general council attending his coronation officially named Carrick as heir—in 1373 the Stewart succession was further strengthened when parliament passed entails defining the manner in which each of the king's sons could inherit the crown. After the coronation John Dunbar who had received the Lordship of Fife from David II now resigned the title so that the king's second son, Robert, Earl of Monteith could receive the Earldom of Fife—Dunbar was compensated with the provision of the earldom of Moray.

A son, David, the future Duke of Rothesay, was born to Carrick and Annabella on 24 October 1378. In 1381, Carrick was calling himself  'lieutenant for the marches'  sustained by his connections to border magnates such as his brother-in-law, James Douglas, son of William, Earl of Douglas, whom he succeeded in 1384.

Guardianship—and its collapse
Robert II's policy of building up Stewart domination in Scotland through the advancement of his sons saw the emergence of Carrick as the pre-eminent Stewart magnate south of the Forth-Clyde line, just as his younger brother Alexander, Earl of Buchan, Lord of Badenoch and Ross had become in the north. 

Prior to 1384 persistent objections regarding Robert II's application of the law were brought to the attention of the council.  Some of these grievances maintained that the King had acted unlawfully by deliberately disregarding charges regarding his personal conduct. Buchan's use of cateran supporters drew criticism from Northern nobles and prelates and demonstrated Robert II's inability or reluctance to control his son. The king's failure to take a leading role in prosecuting the war with England and Buchan's abuse of royal power in the north was the backdrop to the general council meeting at Holyrood Abbey in November 1384, where the decision was taken to sideline the king and provide the ruling powers to Carrick as Guardian of Scotland.

Within weeks Carrick's actions signaled changes in the direction of crown strategy where the Carrick–Douglas affinity was, by far, the largest group to benefit from crown patronage. On 13 March 1385 it emerged that an unauthorised payment of £700 in bullion, a huge amount, had been taken by the guardian from the customs of Edinburgh. It transpired that Fife, also Chamberlain of Scotland, had been struggling to check Carrick's misuse of the Crown finances during 1384–5.

In April 1385, the general council sharply condemned Buchan's behaviour and sat with the intention of maneuvering Carrick into firmly intervening in the north. In July, under Carrick's guardianship, a Scottish army that included a French force commanded by Admiral Jean de Vienne penetrated into the north of England without any serious gains but provoked a damaging retaliatory attack by Richard II. Yet in the north, Carrick did not bring Buchan under control and many of the Guardian's supporters although pleased at the resumption of hostilities with England were unhappy at the continued northern lawlessness. Carrick had been made Guardian partly on the need to curb Buchan's excesses yet despite this by February 1387 Buchan had become even more powerful and influential when he was appointed Justiciar north of the Forth. The war with England was halted by a series of truces but on 19 April 1388, English envoys sent to Scotland to again extend the ceasefire returned to Richard's court empty-handed—by 29 April Robert II was conducting a council in Edinburgh to authorise renewed conflict with England. Although the Scots army defeated the English at the Battle of Otterburn in Northumberland in August 1388, its leader, the Earl of Douglas, was killed. Douglas died childless, triggering a series of claims on his estate—Carrick backed his brother-in-law Malcolm Drummond, the husband of Douglas's sister, while Carrick's brother, Robert Earl of Fife, took the side of Sir Archibald Douglas, Lord of Galloway, who held an entail on his kinsman's estates, and who ultimately succeeded to the earldom. Fife, with his new powerful Douglas ally, together with those loyal to the king, ensured at the December 1388 council meeting that the guardianship of Scotland would pass from Carrick (who had recently been badly injured from a horse-kick) to Fife.
There was general approval of Fife's intention to properly resolve the situation of lawlessness in the north and in particular the activities of Buchan his younger brother. Buchan was stripped of his position of justiciar, which would soon be given to Fife's son, Murdoch Stewart. In January 1390 Robert II was in the north-east perhaps to strengthen the now changed political outlook in the north of the kingdom. He returned to Dundonald Castle in Ayrshire in March where he died on 19 April and was buried at Scone on 25 April.

Reign

In May 1390 parliament granted John permission to change his regnal name to Robert, probably in part to maintain the link back to Robert I but also to disassociate himself from King John Balliol. The four-month delay in the crowning of Robert III can be seen as a period when Fife and his affinity sought to ensure their future positions, and which also saw Buchan's opportunistic attack on Elgin Cathedral, settling an old score with the Bishop of Moray, and possibly also a protest at Fife's reappointment as the king's lieutenant.

Rothesay's lieutenancy 
In 1392, Robert III strengthened the position of his son David, now Earl of Carrick, when he endowed him with a large annuity that allowed the young prince to build up his household and affinity, and then in 1393 regained his right to direct rule when the general council decided that Fife's lieutenancy should end and that Carrick, now of age, should assist his father. This independence of action was demonstrated in 1395–6, when he responded to Carrick's unauthorised marriage to Elizabeth Dunbar, daughter of George, Earl of March, by ensuring its annulment. The king appears to have also taken over the conduct of foreign affairs, preserving the peace with Richard II and managing to increase the power of the Red Douglas Earl of Angus in the southeast of the country as a counterbalance to Fife's Black Douglas ally. He further showed his authority when in an attempt to reduce inter-clan feuding and lawlessness, he arranged and oversaw a gladiatorial limited combat between the clans of Kay and Quhele (Clan Chattan) in Perth on 28 April 1396. Carrick progressively acted independently of his father taking control of the Stewart lands in the south-west, while maintaining his links with the Drummonds of his mother, and all at a time when Fife's influence in central Scotland remained strong.

The king was increasingly blamed for the failure to pacify the Gaelic areas in the west and north. The general council held in Perth in April 1398 criticised the king's governance, and empowered his brother Robert and his son David—now respectively the Dukes of Albany and Rothesay—to lead an army against Donald, Lord of the Isles, and his brothers. In November 1398, an influential group of magnates and prelates met at Falkland Castle that included Albany, Rothesay, Archibald, Earl of Douglas, Albany's son Murdoch, justiciar North of the Forth along with the bishops Walter of St Andrews and Gilbert of Aberdeen—the outcome of this meeting manifested itself at the council meeting held in January 1399 when the king was forced to surrender power to Rothesay for a period of three years.

The kin of the border earls took advantage of the confusion in England after the deposition of Richard II by Henry IV, and harried and forayed into England causing much damage, and taking Wark Castle around 13 October 1399. A far-reaching dispute between Rothesay and George Dunbar, Earl of March, occurred when Rothesay, rather than remarrying Elizabeth Dunbar as previously agreed, decided to marry Mary Douglas, daughter of the Earl of Douglas. March, enraged by this, wrote to Henry IV on 18 February 1400, and by July had entered Henry's service. In 1401, Rothesay took on a more assertive and autonomous attitude, circumventing proper procedures, unjustifiably appropriating sums from the customs of the burghs on the east coast, before provoking further animosity when he confiscated the revenues of the temporalities of the vacant bishopric of St Andrews. Rothesay had also in conjunction with his uncle, Alexander Stewart, Earl of Buchan, confronted Albany's influence in central Scotland. As soon his lieutenancy expired in 1402, Rothesay was arrested and imprisoned in Albany's Falkland Castle where he died in March 1402. Rothesay's death probably lay with Albany and Douglas, who would have looked upon the possibility of the young prince acceding to the throne with great apprehension. They certainly fell under suspicion, but were cleared of all blame by a general council,  'where, by divine providence and not otherwise, it is discerned that he departed from this life.'

Albany's lieutenancy 

Following Rothesay's death, and with the restoration of the lieutenancy to Albany and the Scottish defeat at the battle of Humbleton, Robert III experienced almost total exclusion from political authority and was limited to his lands in the west. By late 1404 Robert, with the aid of his close councilors Henry Sinclair, Earl of Orkney, Sir David Fleming and Henry Wardlaw, had succeeded in re-establishing himself and intervened in favour of Alexander Stewart, the Earl of Buchan's illegitimate son, who was in dispute with Albany over the earldom of Mar. Robert III again exhibited his new resolve when in December 1404 he created a new regality in the Stewartry for his sole remaining son and heir, James, now Earl of Carrick—an act designed to prevent these lands falling into Albany's hands.

By 28 October 1405 Robert III had returned to Dundonald Castle in Ayrshire. With the king's health failing, it was decided in the winter of 1405–6 to send the young prince to France out of the reach of Albany. Despite this, the manner of James's flight from Scotland was unplanned. In February 1406, James together with Orkney and Fleming, at the head of a large group of followers left the safety of Bishop Wardlaw's protection in St Andrews and journeyed through the hostile Douglas territories of east Lothian—an act probably designed to demonstrate James's royal endorsement of his custodians, but also a move by his custodians to further their own interests in the traditional Douglas heartlands. Events went seriously wrong for James and he had to escape to the Bass Rock in the Firth of Forth along with the Earl of Orkney after his escorts were attacked by James Douglas of Balvenie, and which resulted in Sir David Fleming's death. Their confinement on the rock was to last for over a month before a ship from Danzig, en route for France, picked them up. On 22 March 1406, the ship was taken by English pirates off Flamborough Head, who delivered James to King Henry IV of England. Robert III had moved to Rothesay Castle where, after hearing of his son's captivity, he died 4 April 1406, and was buried in Paisley Abbey, which had been founded by the Stewarts.

Family and issue

King Robert III married Anabella Drummond, the daughter of Sir John Drummond of Stobhall and Mary Montifex, daughter of Sir William Montifex, in c.1366/7.  They had seven children:
 David Stewart, Duke of Rothesay (b. 24 Oct 1378- d. 26 Mar 1402), who was betrothed to Elizabeth Dunbar but later married Lady Marjory Douglas, the daughter of Archibald Douglas, 3rd Earl of Douglas and Joanna de Moravia of Strathearn.
 James I Stewart (b. Dec 1394 – d. 21 Feb 1437), King of Scots.
 Robert Stewart (died young)
 Margaret Stewart (died between 1450 and 1456), married Archibald Douglas, 4th Earl of Douglas, the son of Archibald Douglas, 3rd Earl of Douglas and Joanna de Moravia of Strathearn.
 Mary Stewart, married 1st George Douglas, 1st Earl of Angus; married 2nd Sir James Kennedy the Younger and gave birth to Gilbert Kennedy, 1st Lord Kennedy; betrothed to Sir William Cunningham; married 3rd to Sir William Graham of Kincardine; married 4th Sir William Edmonstone of Culloden and  1st of Duntreath (ancestors of the Edmonstone baronets)
 Egidia Stewart, died unmarried.
 Elizabeth Stewart, married James Douglas, 1st Lord Dalkeith, son of Sir James Douglas and Agnes Dunbar.

He also had at least two older illegitimate children:
 John Stewart of Ardgowan and Blackhall, (b. 1364 – d. 1412) who was an ancestor to the Shaw-Stewart baronets.
 James Stewart of Kilbride

Historiography
Abbot Walter Bower reported that Robert III described himself as "the worst of kings and the most miserable of men". Gordon Donaldson in his general history Scottish Kings (1967) agrees and writes of the first two Stewart kings "that a famous dynasty, which was to produce so many men of remarkable ability ... made a somewhat pedestrian beginning". He immediately qualifies this statement with "it is true that the sources, both record and narrative, are scanty". He goes further and explains "admittedly, no attempt has yet been made to bring the resources of modern historical research to bear on Robert II and Robert III ... but it is beyond the bounds of probability that even if this is done either of them will emerge as a man who did much positively to shape Scottish history." When Robert III re-established his personal rule in 1393, Donaldson characterises it as a period of anarchy, and of a king who couldn't control his brothers Albany and Buchan, nor his son Rothesay.

Ranald Nicholson agrees with Donaldson in his Scotland: The Later Middle Ages (1974), and describes Robert III as a failure, like his father, because he wasn't dominant. Nicholson's opinion was that in his period as Lieutenant in the 1380s, Robert (John, Earl of Carrick) was incapable of dealing with the breakdown of law and order, citing the number of legal cases. The lameness of Carrick after being kicked by a horse was explained by Nicholson as the excuse needed to have him replaced by his brother Robert, Earl of Fife as the king's lieutenant.  Nicholson writes, "nothing much was to be hoped for in the heir apparent", and goes on to blame Robert III for the destruction of Forres and Elgin, despite the lieutenancy of Fife at the time.

Andrew Barrell in his book Medieval Scotland (2000) puts forward that the first two Stewart kings, "had difficulty in asserting themselves, partly because their dynasty was new to kingship and needed to establish itself". Robert III's period of personal rule from 1393 was "disastrous" according to Barrell, and was exemplified by the king's failure to re-take the royal fortress of Dumbarton. Barrell's final assessment of Robert III was of a man crippled in body and incapable or averse to personally confronting Albany but sought to do so through promoting the status of his sons, and even then he failed.

Alexander Grant in Independence and Nationhood (1984) found Robert III to be "probably Scotland's least impressive king". Grant puts this into perspective and writes that it is notable that Robert III's reign could have been worse compared to the turmoil and violence experienced in England and France when ruled by weak kings. Even on Robert's death, Scotland didn't descend into open civil war but was restricted to positioning among the royal family and its magnate groupings. Grant, in The New Cambridge Medieval History, explains that the 13th-century Scottish kings ruled with the endorsement of practically all the political classes but that none of the 14th-century kings, from Robert I to Robert III, did so and retained loyalty by the use of patronage. The benefits of this were outweighed by the disadvantages—alienated lands reduced crown income, endowments had the same effect, the estates granted to nobles and church often in regality led to a loss of royal attendance within these territories and contributed to a diminishment of authority.

Michael Lynch suggests that the earlier 20th-century historians made hasty evaluations of both Robert II and Robert III when they characterised them as "pathetically weak personalities" and their reigns as "nineteen years of senility and sixteen of infirmity". Lynch also makes the point that the complaints made in the later chronicles of lawlessness and disturbance in the country were mainly confined to the north with the king's brother Alexander, Lord of Badenoch and Earl of Buchan at its root. The death of John, Lord of the Isles heralded a state of dissension between the lordship and the crown that was to last for two generations and which even Robert III's successor James I was unable to deal with properly. Lynch states that much of the troubles during Robert III's reign derived from the sharp deterioration of the royal revenues. The unruliness of northern Scotland was the result of competing factions within the royal family—Lynch suggests that the weakness in kingship before 1406 "can be exaggerated", citing Buchan's enforced appearance at Robert III's council to answer for his incendiary attack on Elgin and its cathedral, and Albany's obtainment of a submission from the lord of the Isles.

In Stephen Boardman's The Early Stewart Kings, the younger Robert, then John, Earl of Carrick, is shown to be an energetic ambitious man and fully engaged in the running of the country, at the centre of Anglo-Scottish diplomacy, and who became the pre-eminent magnate in Scotland and whose political importance south of the Forth would eclipse that of his father's. Boardman describes how in 1384 he callously engineered the council to remove his father from power and to place it in his hands. Many of the problems of Robert III's rule, Boardman argues, stemmed from the death of his brother-in-law and close ally James, Earl of Douglas at Otterburn in 1388, when his deliberately constructed and powerful affinity south of the Forth crumbled. That same year Carrick lost the lieutenancy to his brother Robert Earl of Fife, that was, Boardman suggests, a blow to the future king's standing and one from which he would not fully recover. According to Boardman, when Robert became king in 1390 he was the victim of his father's style of government characterised by Robert II's creation of his sons, sons-in-law, and other major territorial nobles as powerful magnates to whom he delegated extensive authority. As a result, Robert III's brothers refused to act simply as liegemen to the king. Robert III, already weakened by the council when he ascended the throne, was in the end completely subordinated to the magnate power of Albany and Douglas.

Fictional portrayals
Robert III has been depicted in historical novels. They include:
 The Fair Maid of Perth (1828) by Walter Scott. The novel covers events from 1396 to 1402, depicting "Scottish Clan feuds" and other disturbances in Robert III's reign. Robert III himself, David Stewart, Duke of Rothesay, and Robert Stewart, Duke of Albany are prominently depicted. Archibald the Grim, Earl of Douglas stands out among the secondary characters.
 The Lords of Misrule (1976) by Nigel Tranter. Covers events from c. 1388 to 1390. Depicting the last years of Robert II of Scotland and the rise of Robert III to the throne. As the elderly king has grown "feeble, weary and half-blind", his sons, daughters and other nobles campaign for power. An ungoverned Scotland is ravaged by their conflicts. Robert Stewart, Duke of Albany and Alexander Stewart, Earl of Buchan are prominently featured.
 A Folly of Princes (1977) by Nigel Tranter. Covers events from c. 1390 to 1402. Robert III turns out to be a weak king. His son David Stewart, Duke of Rothesay, and brother Robert Stewart, Duke of Albany rival each other for political power in his court. But the struggle attracts the attention of Richard II and Henry IV, leading to English involvement.
 The Captive Crown (1977) by Nigel Tranter. Covers events from 1402 to 1411. It depicts the last few years in the reign of Robert III, the captivity of James I of Scotland at the hands of Henry IV and the events back in Scotland. Concluding with the Battle of Harlaw.

Family tree
Some of the most powerful Scots of Robert III's time were his close relatives.

See also
 Scottish monarchs' family tree

References

Sources

External links
Robert III at the official website of the British monarchy

Scottish princes
House of Stuart
Earls or mormaers of Carrick
14th-century Scottish earls
1330s births
1406 deaths
Year of birth uncertain
14th-century Scottish monarchs
15th-century Scottish monarchs
High Stewards of Scotland